Dorothy is an oil painting by American artist William Merritt Chase. Created in 1902, it is currently part of the permanent collection in the Indianapolis Museum of Art.

Description
The image's subject is Chase's 11-year-old daughter, Dorothy, wearing a white dress with full-length sleeves, a straw hat with a green bow, a black belt, black tights, and black shoes. She is standing against a brown background without any detail, so the viewer's eye is focused only on her. Dorothy stares straight out at the viewer, engaging them. With a 6' canvas, Dorothy is reminiscent of full-length Baroque paintings of emperors, giving the young girl a grandiose image.

Historical information
Chase's favorite image to paint was his family, including his wife and his daughters, which are also his most well received.  Dorothy is a painting in a series of full-length portraits Chase created of his family between 1886 and 1902.

Chase was the founder of the Chase School, which eventually became Parsons The New School for Design, one of the most famous art schools in the United States. As a teacher, some of his students include Charles Demuth and Georgia O'Keeffe.

Acquisition
Dorothy was purchased from the artist at the Exhibition of Indiana Art in Tomlinson Hall, in 1903, using the John Herron fund.

References

Paintings in the collection of the Indianapolis Museum of Art
1902 paintings
Paintings by William Merritt Chase
Paintings of children